Morteza Mehrzadselakjani (born 17 September 1987) is an Iranian volleyball player who plays in the national sitting volleyball team of and Mes Shahr Babak. With a height of 247 cm, he is known as the tallest living man in Iran and the second tallest living man in the world. He was able to win two gold medals and the Golden Ball for the best player in the world in 2022 at the 2016 Rio and 2020 Tokyo Paralympics.

He is part of the Iran men's national sitting volleyball team. He has acromegaly, and has won the Gold medal at the 2016 Summer Paralympics in Rio de Janeiro, 2018 Asian Para Games in Jakarta, 2018 Sitting Volleyball World Championship and 2020 Summer Paralympics In Tokyo and 2022 Sitting Volleyball World Championship in Sarajevo with Iran men's national sitting volleyball team. At club level he played for Samen Al Hojjaj Sabzevar in 2015.

Biography 
Mehrzad was born with a rare medical condition called acromegaly which is triggered by excessive growth hormone production in the brain's pituitary gland. He was measured over 6 feet and 2 inches at the age of 16. When he was 15 he had a bicycle accident which caused a serious pelvic fracture. The accident stopped his right leg from growing, leaving it about 15 centimeters shorter than his left leg. He started to feel depressed after the accident. He started using a wheelchair, crutches and a walking stick following the accident.

Career 
His talent was spotted and identified by Iran national head coach Hadi Rezaei in 2011 after watching a television program which talked about unusual and differently able talented people. Hadi quickly got in touch with the television network to inquire about Mehrzad who was also one of the disabled talents to have participated in the program. Hadi convinced and encouraged Mehrzad to play sitting volleyball.

He was selected for Iran's national team in March 2016 after undergoing training sessions at various regional clubs in Iran and made his international debut in 2016 at the Paralympics qualifiers. Subsequently, he was also selected for the national team to compete at the 2016 Summer Paralympics, which marked his Paralympic debut.

In the 2016 Summer Paralympics sitting volleyball final, he was the match top scorer with 28 points for Iran. Iran eventually secured a gold medal after defeating Bosnia and Herzegovina 3–1 in the final. He was also the second best spiker during the 2016 Rio Paralympics.

In 2018, he helped Iran win the 2018 Sitting Volleyball World Championship, securing Iran's first world title in 8 years, after a 3–0 victory over defending champions Bosnia and Herzegovina in the final.

In the 2022 Summer Paralympics sitting volleyball, Mehrzad won his second Gold Medal at the Paralympic Games after defeating Bosnia and Herzegovina 3-0 in the semi-final and Russia 3–1 in the final with Iran's national team.

In 2022, he won his second Sitting Volleyball World Championship with Iran's national team in the 2022 Sitting Volleyball World Championship, after a 3–0 victory over Bosnia and Herzegovina in the final.

See also
 Sitting volleyball at the 2016 Summer Paralympics
 List of tallest people
 List of humans with gigantism

References

External links 

 

1987 births
Living people
Volleyball players at the 2016 Summer Paralympics
Paralympic competitors for Iran
Medalists at the 2016 Summer Paralympics
Paralympic gold medalists for Iran
Iranian sitting volleyball players
Men's sitting volleyball players
People with acromegaly
Sportspeople from Mazandaran province
Paralympic medalists in volleyball
Paralympic volleyball players of Iran
People with gigantism
Volleyball players at the 2020 Summer Paralympics
21st-century Iranian people